William Thompson (born 1888, date of death unknown) was a cricketer. He played in two first-class matches for British Guiana in 1907/08 and 1908/09.

See also
 List of Guyanese representative cricketers

References

External links
 

1888 births
Year of death missing
Cricketers from British Guiana